Barbara Gilewska (1911-1986) was a Polish film actress and dancer. She was born 16 October 1911 and died in Warsaw 23 September 1986.

First known as a dancer, she performed in a number of Warsaw revues, including Nowym Ananasie (1931–32), Qui Pro Quo (1932), Morskie Oko (1932), Feminie (1932), Rexie (1933), and Nowej Rewii (1934). She also worked in touring companies, traveling to Kielce, Nowy Sącz and Tarnów. She also performed for the Dramatic Theater of the Second Polish Army in Lodz.

In film, she had a number of bit parts, working with major Polish actors including Eugeniusz Bodo, Witold Conti, and Jadwiga Smosarska.

Filmography 
 1930: Janko Muzykant, uncredited
 1933: Wyrok życia as Jadzia's friend, uncredited
 1933: Prokurator Alicja Horn as woman in the courtroom at the trial of Jan Winkler
 1933: Jego ekscelencja subiekt as participant of the New Year's Eve ball, uncredited
 1934: Pieśniarz Warszawy as newsagent Zosia
 1935: Nie miała baba kłopotu or Granny Had No Worries as Basia Boczkówna
 1935: Kochaj tylko mnie as Basia, Lidia Relska's maid

References

External links

Barbara Gilewskakeyin the database of the National Polish Film Archives Fototeka.
Barbara Gilewska at Nitrofilm.

Polish film actresses
1986 deaths
Polish female dancers
20th-century dancers
20th-century Polish actresses
1911 births